James S. Milne (born 10 October 1942 in Invercargill, New Zealand) is a New Zealand mathematician working in arithmetic geometry.

Life 

Milne attended the High School in Invercargill in New Zealand until 1959, and then studied at the University of Otago in Dunedin (B.A. 1964) and Harvard University (Masters 1966, Ph.D. 1967 under John Tate). From then to 1969 he was a lecturer at University College London.  After that he was at the University of Michigan, as Assistant Professor (1969–1972), Associate Professor (1972–1977), Professor (1977–2000), and Professor Emeritus (since 2000). He has also been a visiting professor at King's College London, at the Institut des hautes études scientifiques in Paris (1975, 1978), at the Mathematical Sciences Research Institute in Berkeley, California (1986–87), and the Institute for Advanced Study in Princeton, New Jersey (1976–77, 1982, 1988).

In his dissertation, entitled "The conjectures of Birch and Swinnerton-Dyer for constant abelian varieties over function fields," he proved the conjecture of Birch and Swinnerton–Dyer for constant abelian varieties over function fields in one variable over a finite field. He also gave the first examples of nonzero abelian varieties with finite Tate–Shafarevich group. He went on to study Shimura varieties (certain hermitian symmetric spaces, low-dimensional examples being modular curves) and motives.

His students include Piotr Blass, Michael Bester, Matthew DeLong, Pierre Giguere, William Hawkins Jr, Matthias Pfau, Victor Scharaschkin, Stefan Treatman, Anthony Vazzana, and Wafa Wei.

Milne is also an avid mountain climber.

Writings 

 Abelian Varieties, Jacobian Varieties, in Arithmetic Geometry Proc. Conference Storrs 1984, Springer 1986
 With Pierre Deligne, Arthur Ogus, Kuang-yen Shih, Hodge Cycles, Motives and Shimura Varieties, Springer Verlag, Lecture Notes in Mathematics vol. 900, 1982 (therein by Deligne: Tannakian Categories)
 Arithmetic Duality Theorems, Academic Press, Perspectives in Mathematics, 1986
 Editor with Laurent Clozel, Automorphic Forms, Shimura Varieties and L-Functions, 2 volumes, Elsevier 1988 (Conference University of Michigan, 1988)
 Elliptic Curves, BookSurge Publishing 2006
 Shimura Varieties and Motives in Jannsen, Kleiman, Serre (editor) motif, Proc. Symp. Pure vol. 55 Math, AMS, 1994

References 

 The original article was a Google translation of the corresponding article in German Wikipedia.

External links 
 Personal website

New Zealand mathematicians
Living people
1942 births
University of Michigan faculty
Harvard University alumni
University of Otago alumni
People from Invercargill
Arithmetic geometers